Rowing was contested at the 1989 Summer Universiade in Duisburg in West Germany.

Medal summary

Medal table

Men's events

Women's events

External links
 Results on HickokSports.com
 Results on sports123.com

Universiade
1989 Summer Universiade